John Strong may refer to:

People
John Strong (mariner), English captain who made the first recorded landing on the Falkland Islands, in 1690
John Strong (Michigan politician) (1830–1913), politician from the U.S. state of Michigan
John Strong (Vermont politician) (1738–1816), American politician
John Franklin Alexander Strong (1856–1929), Alaskan politician
John Strong (educationalist) (1868–1945), British educationalist
John Clifford Strong (born 1922), British governor of the Turks and Caicos, 1978–1982
John Anderson Strong (1915–2012), Scottish surgeon and academic
John D. Strong (1905–1992), professor of physics and astronomy
John S. Strong (born 1948), American religion academic
John Strong (actor) (born 1969), Ukrainian pornographic actor and director
Johnny Strong (born 1974), actor
John Strong (sportscaster) (born 1985), TV sportscaster
John Strong (colonist) (1610–1699), English-born New England colonist and politician
John Strong Sr. (1798–1881), English–American farmer and politician

Other uses
Mrs. John L. Strong, a privately held American luxury company and manufacturer of custom papers and stationery

See also
Jack Strong (disambiguation)
John Strong Newberry (1822–1892), U.S. geologist
John Stronge of the Stronge baronets

Strong, John